The following is an episode list for MyNetworkTV's television series Desire. The series began on  September 5, 2006, and finished on December 5, 2006.

The show originally aired Monday through Friday at 8:00 p.m. with a highlights episode airing every Saturday night at 8:00 p.m..

There were a total of 65 episodes of Desire aired.

The list is ordered by the episodes' original air dates. The show used many flashbacks and reused much footage.

Episodes

External links
 

Desire